Tetrarhanis schoutedeni is a butterfly in the family Lycaenidae. It is found in Cameroon and Sankuru in the Democratic Republic of the Congo. The habitat consists of primary forests.

References

Butterflies described in 1954
Poritiinae